The Second Philippine Legislature was the meeting of the legislature of the Philippines under the sovereign control of the United States from March 28, 1910 to February 6, 1912.

Sessions
First Special Session: March 28 – April 19, 1910
First Regular Session: October 17, 1910 – February 3, 1911
Second Regular Session: October 16, 1911 – February 1, 1912
Second Special Session: February 2 – 6, 1912

Legislation
The Second Philippine Legislature passed a total of 221 laws (Act Nos. 1971–2191)

Leadership

Philippine Commission
Governor-General: William Cameron Forbes

Philippine Assembly
Speaker: Sergio Osmeña (Cebu-2nd, Nacionalista)

Members

Philippine Commission

Sources:

 Colby, Frank Moore (1911). The New International Yearbook: A Compendium of the World's Progress for the Year 1910. New York: Dodd, Mead and Company.
 Journal of the Philippine Commission Being the Second Session of the First Philippine Legislature. Manila: Bureau of Printing. 1910.
 Journal of the Philippine Commission Being A Special Session, March 28, 1910, to April 19, 1910, and the First Session, October 17, 1910, to February 3, 1911, of the Second Philippine Legislature. Manila: Bureau of Printing. 1911.
 Journal of the Philippine Commission Being the Second Session, October 16, 1911, to February 1, 1912, and A Special Session, February 2, 1912, to February 6, 1912, of the Second Philippine Legislature. Manila: Bureau of Printing. 1912.

Philippine Assembly

Notes:

See also 
Congress of the Philippines
Senate of the Philippines
House of Representatives of the Philippines

External links

Further reading
Philippine House of Representatives Congressional Library

02